Andreas Zachhuber (born 29 May 1962 in Wismar, East Germany) is a German football manager and former player. He last managed Hansa Rostock.

References

1962 births
Living people
People from Wismar
People from Bezirk Rostock
East German footballers
Footballers from Mecklenburg-Western Pomerania
Association football forwards
FC Hansa Rostock players
Greifswalder SV 04 managers
German football managers
2. Bundesliga managers
FC Hansa Rostock managers